Junction Motor Speedway is a recently constructed 3/8 mile dirt oval that is located just west of McCool Junction, Nebraska, United States, along U.S. Route 81.

The track is currently owned and promoted by Delmar Friesen.  The track cost a total of two million dollars to construct.

External links 
  Official Website

Dirt oval race tracks in the United States
Motorsport venues in Nebraska
Buildings and structures in York County, Nebraska
Tourist attractions in York County, Nebraska